Gogi-guksu is one of the traditional foods of the Jeju Province (Jeju-do), South Korea. It is a soup prepared with pork and noodles, and served with garnishes. It is similar to Vietnamese Pho.

Because of poor soil conditions in Jeju Province, people in Jeju mainly live on wheat and barley, so a culture of noodles developed. In addition, Jeju-do has a tradition of people giving gifts of pork during happy occasions. Gogi-guksu is the result of these two cultural ideas in jeju-do.

Gogi-guksu is only sold in Jeju-do. Therefore, Gogi-guksu is kind of Janchi-guksu in Jeju, traditional food.

See also 

 Korean noodles
 Kalguksu
 List of soups
 Sujebi
 Kuksu

References 

Jeju cuisine
Korean noodle dishes
Noodle soups